Choi Gwang-Ji  is a Korean football forward who played for South Korea in the 1984 Asian Cup. He also played for Kwangwoon University

International Records

References

External links

South Korean footballers
South Korea international footballers
1963 births
Living people
Association football forwards